Tianxin or Tian Xin may refer to:

Places 
 Tianxin, Longchuan (田心镇), a town in Longchuan County, Guangdong, China
 Tianxin, Zhuzhou (田心街道), a subdistrict of Shifeng District, Zhuzhou, Hunan, China
 Tianxin District (天心区), a district of Changsha City, Hunan, China

People 
 Tian Xin (born 1998), Chinese footballer 
 Tian Xin (actress) (born 1975), Taiwanese actress